Mojca Rataj (born 9 December 1979) is a Bosnian-Slovenian alpine skier. She competed in the women's slalom at the 2006 Winter Olympics.

References

1979 births
Living people
Bosnia and Herzegovina female alpine skiers
Olympic alpine skiers of Bosnia and Herzegovina
Alpine skiers at the 2006 Winter Olympics
Sportspeople from Maribor
Universiade silver medalists for Slovenia
Slovenian female alpine skiers
Universiade medalists in alpine skiing
Competitors at the 2001 Winter Universiade